The American System was an economic plan that played an important role in American policy during the first half of the 19th century, rooted in the "American School" ideas of Alexander Hamilton.

A plan to strengthen and unify the nation, the American System was advanced by the Whig Party and a number of leading politicians including Henry Clay and John Quincy Adams. Clay was the first to refer to it as the "American System". Motivated by a growing American economy bolstered with major exports such as cotton, tobacco, native sod, and tar they sought to create a structure for expanding trade. This System included such policies as:

 Support for a high tariff to protect American industries and generate revenue for the federal government
 Maintenance of high public land prices to generate federal revenue
 Preservation of the Bank of the United States to stabilize the currency and rein in risky state and local banks
 Development of a system of internal improvements (such as roads and canals) which would knit the nation together and be financed by the tariff and land sales.
Clay protested that the West, which opposed the tariff, should support it since urban factory workers would be consumers of western foods. In Clay's view, the South (which also opposed high tariffs) should support them because of the ready market for cotton in northern mills. This last argument was the weak link. The South never strongly supported the American System and had access to plenty of markets for its cotton exports.

Portions of the American System were enacted by the United States Congress. The Second Bank of the United States was rechartered in 1816 for 20 years. High tariffs were first suggested by Alexander Hamilton in his 1791 Report on Manufactures but were not approved by Congress until the Tariff of 1816.  Tariffs were subsequently raised until they peaked in 1828 after the so-called Tariff of Abominations. After the Nullification Crisis in 1833, tariffs remained the same rate until the Civil War. However, the national system of internal improvements was never adequately funded; the failure to do so was due in part to sectional jealousies and constitutional squabbles about such expenditures.

In 1830, President Jackson rejected a bill which would allow the federal government to purchase stock in the Maysville, Washington, Paris, and Lexington Turnpike Road Company, which had been organized to construct a road linking Lexington and the Ohio River, the entirety of which would be in the state of Kentucky. Jackson's Maysville Road veto was  due to both his personal conflict with Clay and his ideological objections.

Main points

The establishment of a protective tariff, a 20%–25% tax on imported goods, would protect a nation's business from foreign competition.  Congress passed a tariff in 1816 which made European goods more expensive and encouraged consumers to buy relatively cheap American-made goods.

The establishment of a national bank would promote a single currency, making trade easier, and issue what was called sovereign credit, i.e., credit issued by the national government, rather than borrowed from the private banking system. In 1816, Congress created the Second Bank of the United States.

The improvement of the country's infrastructure, especially transportation systems, made trade easier and faster for everyone.  Poor roads made transportation slow and costly.

The American System became the leading tenet of the Whig Party of Henry Clay and Daniel Webster. It was opposed by the Democratic Party of Andrew Jackson, Martin Van Buren, James K. Polk, Franklin Pierce, and James Buchanan  prior to the Civil War, often on the grounds that the points of it were unconstitutional.

Among the most important internal improvements created under the American System was the Cumberland Road.

Annual message of 1815 (Seven Points)
Funds for national defense
Frigates for the Navy
A standing army and federal control of the militia
Federal aid for building roads and canals
A protective tariff to encourage manufacturers
Re-establishing the National Bank
Federal assumption of some state debt

See also
American School (economics)
Economic nationalism
Protectionism
Tariffs
Tariffs in United States history
Protectionism in the United States
Friedrich List, German-American economist
Import substitution industrialization, a key feature of the American System adopted in much of the Third World during the twentieth century
Lincoln's expansion of the federal government's economic role
National Policy, a similar economic plan used by Canada circa 1867–1920s
Australian settlement

Further reading

Modern books
Michael, Diaz, The Promise of American Life (2005 reprint)
Joseph Dorfman. The Economic Mind in American Civilization, 1606–1865 (1947) 2 vol
Eckes, Jr. Alfred E. "Opening America's Market—U.S. Foreign Trade Policy Since (1995) University of North Carolina Press
Foner, Eric. Free Soil, Free Labor, Free Men: The Ideology of the Republican Party before the Civil War (1970)
Gill, William J. Trade Wars Against America: A History of United States Trade and Monetary Policy (1990)
Carter Goodrich, Government Promotion of American Canals and Railroads, 1800–1890 (Greenwood Press, 1960)
 Goodrich, Carter. "American Development Policy: the Case of Internal Improvements," Journal of Economic History, 16 (1956), 449–60. in JSTOR
 Goodrich, Carter. "National Planning of Internal Improvements," Political Science Quarterly, 63 (1948), 16–44. in JSTOR
John Lauritz Larson. Internal Improvement: National Public Works and the Promise of Popular Government in the Early United States (2001)
Lively, Robert A. "The American System, a Review Article," Business History Review, XXIX (March, 1955), 81–96. recommended starting point
Lind, Michael Hamilton's Republic: Readings in the American Democratic Nationalist Tradition (1997)
Lind, Michael What Lincoln Believed: The Values and Convictions of America's Greatest President (2004)
Remini, Robert V. Henry Clay: Statesman for the Union, 1991
Edward Stanwood, American Tariff Controversies in the 19th Century (1903; reprint 1974), 2 vols., favors protectionism
 Charles M. Wiltse, John C. Calhoun: Nationalist, 1782–1828 (1944)

Other/older books
G. B. Curtiss, Protection and Prosperity: an; W. H. Dawson, Protection in Germany (London, 1904)
Alexander Hamilton, Report on the Subject of Manufactures, communicated to the House of Representatives, 5 December 1791
H. C. Carey, Principles of Social Science (3 vols., Philadelphia, 1858–1859), Harmony of Interests Agricultural, Manufacturing and Commercial (Philadelphia, 1873)
Friedrich List, Outlines of American Political Economy (1980 reprint)
Friedrich List, National System of Political Economy (1994 reprint)
A. M. Low, Protection in the United States (London, 1904); H. 0. Meredith, Protection in France (London, 1904)
Ellis H. Roberts, Government Revenue, especially the American System, an argument for industrial freedom against the fallacies of free trade (Boston, 1884)
J. P. Young, Protection and Progress: a Study of the Economic Bases of the American Protective System (Chicago, 1900)
Clay, Henry. The Papers of Henry Clay'', 1797–1852. Edited by James Hopkins

Sources and notes

External links
The American System: Speeches on the Tariff Question and Internal Improvements by Congressman Andrew Stewart

Economic history of the United States
Great Triumvirate
Henry Clay
Political history of the United States
Presidency of John Quincy Adams
Economic nationalism
United States economic policy
United States public land law